Events in the year 1787 in Norway.

Incumbents
Monarch: Christian VII

Events
15 March - Lofthusreisingen ends.

Arts and literature
Det Dramatiske Selskab in Christiansand is founded.

Births

Full date unknown
Sjur Hansen Halkjeldsvik, politician (d.1868)
Nicolai Johan Lohmann Krog, politician and Minister (d.1856)
Johan Frederik Knudzen Nødbæk, politician
Johan Henrik Rye, jurist and politician (d.1868)
Jørgen Fredrik Spørck, military officer and politician (d.1866)

Deaths

Full date unknown
Jens Schanche, postmaster (born 1717).

See also

References